This is a list of Spanish Viceroys of Navarre from 1512 to 1840, when the function was abolished.

1512 : Diego Fernández de Córdoba y Arellano, marqués de Comares
1515 : Fadrique de Acuña, Conde de Buendía 
1516 : Antonio Manrique de Lara, Duque de Nájera 
1521 : Francisco López de Zúñiga, Conde de Miranda 
1524 : Diego de Avellaneda, Bishop of Tuy 
1527 : Martín Alfonso Fernández de Córdoba, Conde de Alcaudete 
1534 : Diego Hurtado de Mendoza, 2nd Marquis of Cañete
1542 : Juan de Vega, Señor de Grajal 
1543 : Luis Hurtado de Mendoza, 2nd Marquess of Mondéjar 
1546 : Álvar Gómez Manrique de Mendoza, Conde de Castrogeriz 
1547 : Luís de Velasco, Señor de Salinas 
1549 : Bernardino de Cárdenas y Pacheco, Duque de Maqueda 
1552 : Beltrán de la Cueva, 3rd Duke of Alburquerque 
1560 : Gabriel de la Cueva, 5th Duke of Alburquerque
1564 : Alfonso de Córdoba y Velasco, Conde de Alcaudete 
1565 : José de Guevara y Tovar, Señor de Escalante 
1567 : Juan de la Cerda y Silva, 4th Duke of Medinaceli
1572 : Vespasiano Gonzaga y Colonna, Prínce of Sabbioneta 
1575 : Sancho Martínez de Leiva, Señor de Leiva 
1579 : Francisco Hurtado de Mendoza, Marqués de Almazán 
1589 : José Martín de Córdoba y Velasco, Marqués de Cortes 
1595 : Juan de Cardona y Requesens, Baron de Sant Boi 
1610 : Alonso Idiáquez de Butrón, Duque de Ciudad Real 
1618 : Felipe Ramírez de Arellano, Conde de Aguilar 
1620 : Juan de Mendoza y Velasco, Marqués de Hinojosa 
1623 : Bernardino González de Avellaneda, Marqués de Castrillo 
1629 : Fernando Girón, Duque de Nemeses 
1629 : Juan Carlos de Guzmán y Silva, Marqués de Fuentes 
1631 : Luis Bravo Acuña 
1634 : Francisco González de Andía, Marqués de Valparaíso 
1637 : Fernando de Andrade y Sotomayor, Archbishop of Burgos 
1638 : Pedro Fajardo Requesens y Zúñiga, Marqués de los Vélez 
1640 : Francesco Maria Carafa y Carafa, 5th  Duke of Nocera 
1641 : Enrique Pimentel, 5th Marqués de Tabara 
1641 : Sebastián Suárez de Mendoza, Conde de La Coruña 
1643 : Duarte Fernando Álvarez de Toledo, Conde de Oropesa 
1645 : Andrea Cantelmo, (1598–1645), a son of Giuseppe, (4th Duke of Popoli), Governor of Luxembourg before 1634.  
1646 : Luis de Guzmán y Ponce de León 
1649 : Diego López Pacheco, 7th Duke of Escalona 
1653 : Diego de Benavides, 8th Count of Santisteban 
1661 : Antonio Álvarez de Toledo y Enriquez de Ribera, (1623–1690), 7th Duke of Alba, 5th Marqués de Villanueva del Río, Knight of the Order of the Golden Fleece. 
1662 : Antonio Pedro Gómez Dávila, Marqués de San Román 
1664 : Francisco de Tutavilla y del Rufo, Duque de San Germán 
1667 : Diego Caballero de Illescas y Cabeza de Vaca 
1671 : Alexander Farnese, Prince of Parma
1676 : Antonio de Velasco y Ayala, Conde de Fuensalida 
1681 : Íñigo de Velandia Arce y Arellano 
1684 : Diego Dávila Mesía y Guzmán, 3rd Marquis of Leganés
1684 : Enrique de Benavides de la Cueva y Bazán, Marqués de Bayona 
1685 : Ernesto Alejandro de Ligné y Croy, Príncipe de Chimay 
1686 : Alejandro de Bournonville, Duque de Bournonville 
1691 : Juan Manuel Fernández Pacheco Cabrera, Duque de Escalona 
1692 : Baltasar de Zúñiga y Guzmán, Marqués de Valero 
1697 : Juan Carlos de Batevile, Marqués de Conflans 
1698 : Pedro Álvarez de Vega, Conde de Grajal 
1699 : Domingo Pignatelli y Vagher, Marqués de San Vicente
1702 : Luis Francisco Benavides y Aragón, marqués de Solera 
1706 : Fernando de Moncada y Aragón, Duque de San Juan
1706 : Alberto Octavio Tserclaes de Tilly
1709 : Fernando de Moncada y Aragón, duque de San Juan 
1712 : Pedro Colón de Portugal y Ayala, duque de Veragua
1713 : Tomás de Aquino, príncipe de Castiglione
1722 : Gonzalo Chacón y Orellana
1723 : Cristóbal de Moscoso y Montemayor, conde de Las Torres
1739 : Antonio Pedro Nolasco de Lanzós y Taboada, conde de Maceda
1749 : Jean Thierry du Mont, comte de Gages
1754 : Fray Manuel de Sada y Antillón, gran capellán de Amposta 
1760 : Juan Francisco Güemes y Orcasitas, conde de Revillagigedo
1760 : Luis Carlos González de Albelda y Cayro, marqués del Cairo
1765 : Honore Ignace de Glymes- Brabante, count of Glymes
1765 : Ambrosio de Funes Villalpando, count of Ricla 
1768 : Alonso Vicente de Solís y Folch de Cardona, duque de Montellano 
1773 : Francisco Bucarelli y Ursúa
1780 : Manuel Azlor y Urriés
1788 : Martín Álvarez de Sotomayor y Soto Flores, conde de Colomera 
1795 : Pablo de Sangro y Merode, príncipe de Castelfranco 
1796 : Joaquín de Fondesviela y Undiano 
1798 : Jerónimo Morejón Girón, marqués de Las Amarillas 
1807 : José Miguel de Carvajal y Manrique de Lara Polanco, duque de San Carlos 
1807 : Leopoldo de Gregorio y Paterno, marqués de Vallesantoro 
1808 : Francisco J. Negrete y Adorno, conde de Campo Alange
1808 : Luis Antonio Bertón des Balbes, duque de Mahón
1810–1813 : No viceroy; replaced by a French military governor
1814 : José Manuel de Ezpeleta, 1st Count of Ezpeleta de Beire
1820–1823 : No viceroy during the Trienio Liberal 
1823 : Luis Rebolledo de Palafox, marqués de Lazán
1824 : Juan Ruiz de Apodaca, 1st Count of Venadito
1826 : Prudencio de Guadalfajara y Aguilera, conde de Castroterreño 
1830 : Manuel Llauder y Camín, marqués del Valle de Rivas 
1832 : Antonio Solá de Figueras
1834 : Pedro Sarsfield y Waters, conde de Sarsfield
1834 : Jerónimo Valdés
1834 : Vicente Genaro de Quesada
1834 : José Ramón Rodil, 1st Marquis of Rodil
1834 : Francisco Espoz y Mina
1834 : Manuel Lorenzo 
1835 : Luis Fernández de Córdova
1835 : Jerónimo Valdés
1835 : Ramón de Meer y Kindelán, barón de Meer 
1835 : Pedro Sarsfield y Waters, conde de Sarsfield
1836 : Ramón de Meer y Kindelán, barón de Meer 
1836 : Pedro Sarsfield y Waters, conde de Sarsfield
1836 : Francisco Cabrera
1836 : Baldomero Espartero, Prince of Vergara 
1836 : Joaquín Ezpeleta Enrile
1837 : Martín José Iriarte 
1837 : Manuel Latre 
1838 : Isidro de Alaix Fábregas
1838 : Diego de León, 1st Count of Belascoáin 
1839 : Felipe Ribero y Lemoine

Sources 
 Virreinato de Navarra

Navarre